The Campeonato Gaúcho (Gaúcho Championship), officially named as Campeonato Gaúcho de Futebol Série A and commonly known as the Gauchão or the Gauchão Ipiranga for sponsorship reasons, is the state football league of the Brazilian state of Rio Grande do Sul. It has been contested since its founding in 1919, being an amateur competition until 1940 when the league became professional. Twelve teams contest in the Campeonato Gaúcho, typically from January to April, for the state championship title.

The rivalry of two of the better-known Brazilian teams (Grêmio and Internacional) have a significant impact in the history of the tournament. Since 1954, the Grenal duo did not win the title on just three occasions:  Juventude was champion in 1998, Caxias, in 2000, under Tite's command, and Novo Hamburgo in 2017.

Internacional is the biggest winner of the competition, with 45 titles, followed by Grêmio with 41 titles and Guarany of Bagé with two titles.

Format
Throughout its history, the Gauchão had various formats of competition, with almost yearly changes to the competition. Currently, the competition has a single group of 12 teams with a single turn, where each team plays against the other only once. The four best ranked clubs advance to the semifinals, which along with the final, are decided in two games.

Qualification for competitions
The best placed of league qualify for the Campeonato Brasileiro Série D, excluding the teams having already qualified for the Série A, Série B, Série C or Série D. The worst placed are relegated to the Campeonato Gaúcho Série A2.

Clubs
Throughout its more than 100-year history, dozens of clubs have played Campeonato Gaúcho, including teams that became inactive. The following 12 clubs competed in the 2021 Série A1 season.

Champions

Notes

9º Regimento de Pelotas is the currently GA Farroupilha.
Floriano is the currently EC Novo Hamburgo.
Ulbra is the currently Canoas SC.

Titles by team 

Teams in bold still active.

By city

Participation

Most appearances

Below is the list of clubs that have more appearances in the Campeonato Gaúcho.

SER Caxias includes the participations of "Associação Caxias de Futebol" (1972–1975), when GE Flamengo and EC Juventude were merged.

See also
Campeonato Gaúcho Série A2
Campeonato Gaúcho Série B
Copa FGF
Recopa Gaúcha
Super Copa Gaúcha
Copa Metropolitana
Copa Sul-Fronteira
Copa Serrana

References

External links
FGF website. Federação Gaúcha de Futebol.
Campeonato Gaúcho regulations. Federação Gaúcha de Futebol.

 
Gaúcho